The name Chantal has been used for eight tropical cyclones worldwide: seven in the Atlantic Ocean and one in the South-West Indian Ocean.

In the Atlantic:
Hurricane Chantal (1983), formed near Bermuda and dissipated in the open ocean.
Hurricane Chantal (1989), formed north of the Yucatán, made landfall as a Category 1 storm in Texas, causing 13 deaths, including 10 on an oil rig construction ship off Louisiana causing $100 million dollars in damage.
Tropical Storm Chantal (1995), never threatened land, dissipated several hundred miles west of Ireland.
Tropical Storm Chantal (2001), degenerated into an open wave shortly after forming, then passed over Trinidad (causing two deaths) and strengthened back into a tropical storm before striking Belize, causing $5 million dollars in damage.
Tropical Storm Chantal (2007), short-lived storm which caused moderate flooding damage in southeastern Newfoundland.
Tropical Storm Chantal (2013), formed west of the Cape Verde Islands and weakened before landfall in Hispaniola,
Tropical Storm Chantal (2019), meandered over the central Atlantic without threatening land. 

In the South-West Indian:
Cyclone Chantal (1961)

Atlantic hurricane set index articles